The Four Corners is a Canadian travel television series which aired on CBC Television in 1957.

Premise
Each episode was presented by a different guest who expressed their views on a given travel destination.

Episodes
 9 July 1957: "Poor People of Paris": Leo Rampen presented life in the Paris market district with film footage and illustrations drawn by Rampen
 16 July 1957: "A Remembrance of Home": Kildare Dobbs presented his poems with film and music to describe his childhood in Ireland and Tanganyika
 23 July 1957: "Flamenco": Alan Brown presents this filmed profile of Spain
 30 July 1957: "Tokyo and the Other Japan": presented by Raoul Engel
 6 August 1957: (details unavailable)
 13 August 1957: "A Half Century North": Danish explorer Peter Freuchen describes his experiences of the far north
 20 August 1957: "Yakback up the Oxus": Frank and Jean Shor explore Marco Polo's route from Italy to China
 27 August 1957: "Waverly Steps": profiles selected residents of Edinburgh, Scotland.

Scheduling
This half-hour series was broadcast on Tuesdays at 10:30 p.m. (Eastern) from 9 July to 27 August 1957.

References

External links
 
 

CBC Television original programming
1957 Canadian television series debuts
1957 Canadian television series endings
Black-and-white Canadian television shows
Canadian travel television series